Van Hansis (born Evan Vanfossen Hansis on September 25, 1981) is an American actor. Hansis portrayed the rich Luke Snyder on the CBS soap opera As the World Turns from December 14, 2005 until the show's final episode September 17, 2010. The son of long running characters on the series, Luke is known for a gay romantic storyline cited as one of the first in American daytime television.

Hansis has had guest roles on several television series and starred in the 2011 thriller film Occupant. In December 2012, he began playing the role of Thom in the dark comedy web series EastSiders. Hansis later played Jess Gibson in the 2013 horror film Devil May Call, and starred as Dusty in the 2015 LGBT mystery film Kiss Me, Kill Me.

Hansis was nominated for a Daytime Emmy Award in 2007, 2008 and 2009 for his As the World Turns role, and was nominated again in 2016 for his role on EastSiders.

Early life and education
Hansis was born in North Adams, Massachusetts, but moved to Greenfield in the third grade when his mother became a principal in the Gill-Montague Regional School District. He attended Four Corners School and later the Greenfield Center School. Hansis began acting in theater camp as a child. He attended high school at a boarding school called Walnut Hill School for the Arts in Natick, because, he says, he knew by then he wanted to be an actor "and it was a good school for that".

Hansis graduated from Carnegie Mellon University in 2004, receiving a Bachelor of Fine Arts in Acting from the School of Drama.

Career
Hansis appeared in the play The Laramie Project in Pittsburgh in 2002, and later worked at the Williamstown Theatre Festival in Massachusetts in productions including On the Razzle and The Witching Hour in 2005.

As the World Turns
Hansis portrayed Luke Snyder on the CBS soap opera As the World Turns from December 14, 2005 until the show's final episode September 17, 2010. Luke, previously played by Jake Weary, is the son of one of the series' long running supercouples, Holden and Lily Snyder (played by Jon Hensley and Martha Byrne, later Noelle Beck). Shortly after Hansis took over the role, the character came out as gay on May 9, 2006. Luke subsequently became involved in a romance with another male character, a pairing eventually hailed as the first gay supercouple in American soap opera history. The August 17, 2007 kiss between Luke and Noah Mayer (played by Jake Silbermann) was the first ever gay male kiss on an American daytime drama. Hansis was nominated for a Daytime Emmy Award for portraying Luke in 2007, 2008 and 2009.

Other projects
From September 2007 to mid-January 2008, Hansis appeared off-Broadway as Lance Sussman in a production of Charles Busch's Die, Mommie, Die!.

In 2011, Hansis guest starred in the Psych episode "This Episode Sucks" as Adrian Viccellio, and the Nikita episode "Clawback" as Yuri Levrov. He next appeared in the 2012 The Mentalist episode "Red Is The New Black" as Derek.

In 2012, Hansis began starring as Thom in the dark comedy web series EastSiders, which explores the aftermath of infidelity on a gay couple in Silverlake, Los Angeles. He has been nominated for two Indie Series Awards for the role, in 2014 and 2016, as well as a 2016 Daytime Emmy nomination.

Hansis starred as Danny Hill in the thriller film Occupant, which premiered on the opening night of the Gotham Screen Film Festival & Screenplay Contest in New York City on October 14, 2011. He next appeared as Jess Gibson in the 2013 horror film Devil May Call. In 2015, Hansis starred as Dusty in the LGBT mystery film Kiss Me, Kill Me.

Filmography

Visual series
 As the World Turns, Luke Snyder (2005–10) – three Daytime Emmy Award nominations
 Psych, Adrian Viccellio – "This Episode Sucks" (2011)
 Nikita, Yuri Levrov – "Clawback" (2011)
 The Mentalist, Derek – "Red Is The New Black" (2012)
 EastSiders, Thom (2012–2019) – web series; one Daytime Emmy nomination, two Indie Series Award nominations

Film
 Occupant (2011), Danny Hill
 Devil May Call (2013), Jess Gibson
 Kiss Me, Kill Me (2015), Dusty
 First Reformed (2017), Roger

Theater
 The Laramie Project, 2002 (Stephen Mead Johnson, Doc O'Connor) – Pittsburgh (dir. Jesse Berger)
 Polaroid Stories (Narcissus), 2004 – Williamstown Theatre Festival
 On the Razzle (Ragamuffin), 2005- Williamstown Theatre Festival (dir. David Jones)
 The Witching Hour (Dr. Scott/ Washington Otis), 2005 (dir. Amanda Charlton) - Williamstown Theatre Festival
 An Evening Honoring The Laramie Project, 2006 – New York (dir. Moisés Kaufman)
 Die, Mommie, Die! (Lance Sussman), 2007- New York (dir. Carl Andress)
 Johnny Applef?%ker, 2007 - New York (dir. Stephen Brackett)
 Dance Dance Revolution (Wiggles), 2008 - New York (dir. Alex Timbers)

Personal life
Hansis came out as gay in The Fight Magazine in May 2014, in an interview with his EastSiders costar and creator, Kit Williamson. He has been with his partner Tyler Hanes since 2007.

Awards and nominations
Hansis was nominated for a Daytime Emmy Award in 2007, 2008 and 2009 for portraying Luke on As the World Turns, and was nominated again in 2016 for his role as Thom on EastSiders. He has also been nominated for two Indie Series Awards for EastSiders, in 2014 and 2016.

|-
| 2007
| As the World Turns
| Outstanding Younger Actor in a Drama Series
| 
| 
| 
| 
|-
| 2008
| As the World Turns
| Outstanding Younger Actor in a Drama Series
| 
| 
| 
| 
|-
| 2009
| As the World Turns
| Outstanding Supporting Actor in a Drama Series
| 
| 
| 
| 
|-
| 2014
| EastSiders
| Best Lead Actor – Drama
| 5th Indie Series Awards
| 
| 
| 
|-
| 2016
| EastSiders
| Outstanding Actor in a Digital Daytime Drama Series
| 43rd Daytime Creative Arts Emmy Awards
| 
|
| 
|-
| 2016
| EastSiders
| Best Lead Actor – Drama
| 7th Indie Series Awards
| 
| 
| 
|}

References

External links

1981 births
American male soap opera actors
American male television actors
Carnegie Mellon University College of Fine Arts alumni
American gay actors
LGBT people from Massachusetts
Living people
Male actors from Massachusetts
People from Greenfield, Massachusetts
People from North Adams, Massachusetts